Farewell to False Paradise is a 1989 German drama film, directed by Tevfik Başer. The film won one award and was nominated for another at the 1989 German Film Awards.

Plot
Elif, the widow of a Turkish migrant worker in Germany, has been sentenced to six years in prison for killing her husband. She is sent to a prison in Hamburg which at first serves as a dark setting of claustrophobia, punishment, and isolation. Her perception then changes as she encounters female solidarity which contrasts with her previous domestic life under patriarchal restrictions as a Muslim-Turkish wife. Having escaped her restrictive life by killing her husband, Elif begins to view the prison as a kind of paradise where she is able to develop a new female identity. While imprisoned, she learns to speak German, cuts her long hair, sheds her traditional headscarf, and gradually adopts the style of a Westernized woman who wears jeans and sneakers. As time goes on, Elif’s prison sentence gets reduced on account of good behavior and she is set to be released. She fears that she will be sent back to Turkey for another murder trial or may get killed by her brother-in-law for revenge, so she attempts to commit suicide.

Cast
Zuhal Olcay as Elif
Brigitte Janner as Marianne
Ruth Olafsdottir as Gabriella
Barbara Morawiecz as Nora
Eva-Maria Kurz as Anna
Celik Bilge as Elif's brother

Awards
At the 1989 German Film Awards, the film won the Film Award in Gold for Outstanding Achievement, which went Zuhal Olcay. The film was also nominated for Outstanding Feature Film.

External links

1989 films
1989 crime drama films
West German films
German drama films
1980s German-language films
Films directed by Tevfik Başer
1980s German films